Veeriyankottai is a Village in Peravurani Taluk in Thanjavur District of Tamil Nadu State, India. It is located 71 km towards South from District headquarters Thanjavur.

4 km from Sethubavachatram,

6 km from Peravurani,

387 km from State capital Chennai and 100 km from tiruchirappalli.

Udayanadu ( 2 km ), Kalanivasal ( 2 km ), Nadiyam ( 3 km ), Kuruvikkarambai ( 4 km ), Marakkavalasai ( 4 km ), Vilangulam ( 5 km ) are the nearby Villages to Veeriyankottai.

Veeriyankottai is surrounded by Peravurani Taluk towards North, Pattukkottai Taluk towards North, Arantangi Taluk towards west, Manalmelkudi Taluk towards South .Peravurani, Pattukkottai, Pudukkottai, Karaikudi are the nearby Cities to Veeraiyankottai. It is near to bay of Bengal. There is a chance of humidity in the weather.

Veeriyankottai  village is located in the UTC 5.30 time zone and it follows Indian standard time(IST). Veeriyankottai sun rise time varies 13 minutes from IST.

Education

Nearby colleges
 Anna University (Pattukkottai Campus), Ecr Road, Rajamadam- 614701
 Manora Polytechnic College, Kambayan Kanni Main Road, Kotakudi, Pattukkottai - Tk., Thanjavur - Dt.
 Sri Vengadesvara Arts and Science (Women), Peravurani -614804
 Dr. Kalam Polytchnic College, Avanam, Peravurani tk
 Govt Arts and Science, Kalainger Nagar, Mudachikadu(po), Peravurani(tk), Thanjavur -614804

Nearby schools
 Atlantic International School, Kulithalai-Sethubavachathiram Highway, Veeriyankottai, Peravurani (tk), Thanjavur -614802
 Muvendar Matric Higher Secondary School, Muvendar nagar, Sengamangalam, Peravurani (tk), Thanjavur -614804
 Govt. Boys Higher Secondary School, Peravurani
 Govt. Girls Higher Secondary School, Peravurani
 August Zion Nursery and Primary School, Peravurani
 Govt. High school, Udaiyanadu, Peravurani tk
 Rajarajan Primary & Nursery School, Veeriyankottai -Udaiyanadu
 Sri Venkateswara CBSE School, Peravurani
 Dr. J.C. Kumarappa Centenary Vidya Mandir, Peravurani
 Kalaimagal Higher Secondary School, Thiruchitrambalam, Peravurani tk
 Veerappa Matric and Higher Secondary School, Peravurani
 GHSS, Pallathur, Sethubavachatram, Thanjavur, Tamil Nadu . PIN- 614803
 GHS- Mallipattinam - Sarapenthira Rajanpattinam, Sethubavachatram, Thanjavur, Tamil Nadu . PIN- 614723, Post - Mallipattinam
 GHSS - Perumagalur - Perumagaloure (south), Sethubavachatram, Thanjavur, Tamil Nadu . PIN- 614612
 GHSS - Kuruvikkarambai, Peravurani

Transport
 Veeriyankottai bus stop
 Kaikatti Bus Stop 	 	
 Buses from Peravurani to Pattukottai or Sethubavachatiram (stopping at Kaikatti)	 	
PR-10 (Sri Balaji Transport), CRC-10, Hmt, Thillainayagi, Ark, Raahath, Rahim, Trichy-Adirampattinam Govt Bus, Lst. 	 	
 Buses from Peravurani to Veeriyankottai (stopping at Veeriyankottai)	 	
A-1, A-11, Ibrahim (mini bus), Thangaraja (gold king), Kakthimurugan, Malar, KTP.

Nearby theatre
 Aathi Muthu saroja theatre - Peravurani,

Hotels
 Sowbagyamani Lodge, Peravurani . 	
 STD residency, Peravurani . 	
 CV lodge, Peravurani .

Nearby hospitals
 Government Hospital - Udayanadu 6 km  	
 Apollo Pharmacy 6 km 	
 Bala nursing home 6 km	
 Dharshana hospital 6 km 	
 Govt hospital peravurani 6 km	
 Govt hospital kuruvikkarambai 2 km

Village statistics

References

District Development Authority, Thanjavur

Villages in Thanjavur district